League tables for teams participating in Kolmonen, the fourth tier of the Finnish soccer league system, in 2004.

League Tables 2004

Helsinki and Uusimaa

Section 1

Section 2

Section 3

South-East Finland, Kaakkois-Suomi

Central Finland, Keski-Suomi

Relegation playoff

First Leg
FCV/Reds      2-2 JPS

Second Leg
JPS           3-0 FCV/Reds

JPS remain at fourth level.

Eastern Finland, Itä-Suomi

Northern Finland, Pohjois-Suomi

Oulu/Kainuu

Lapland, Lappi

Pohjois-Suomi Playoff

First Leg
FC-88         1-3 Dreeverit

Second Leg
Dreeverit     2-0 FC-88

Dreeverit to Promotion Playoff Group D.

Central Ostrobothnia, Keski-Pohjanmaa

Preliminary stage

Relegation playoff Group
(preliminary stage points included)

Relegation playoff

First Leg
VetU          3-2 KPS

Second Leg
KPS           6-2 VetU

KPS remain at fourth level.

Vaasa

Preliminary stage

Relegation playoff Group

(preliminary stage points included)

Vaasa/Central Ostrobothnia Promotion Playoff Group

NB: Öja-73, NIK and Sundom IF withdrew from Promotion Playoff and then Sepsi-78 and Jaro II took their places.

Satakunta

Tampere

Relegation playoff
Härmä 5-0 FC Vapsi

Härmä promoted, FC Vapsi relegated.

Turku and Åland, Turku and Ahvenanmaa

Promotion Playoff

Promotion Playoff Group A
Round 1
GrIFK         0-0 Futura
Ponnistus     bye

Round 2
Futura        2-0 Ponnistus
GrIFK         bye

Round 3
Ponnistus     0-3 GrIFK
Futura        bye

Final Table:

Promotion Playoff Group B
Round 1
PoPa          1-1  PS-44
SoVo          bye

Round 2
SoVo          3-2  PoPa
PS-44         bye

Round 3
PS-44         1-3 SoVo
PoPa          bye

Final Table:

Promotion Playoff Group C
Round 1
FCV           2-1 KuPS II
Kajo          bye

Round 2
KuPS II       3-1 Kajo
FCV           bye

Round 3
Kajo          2-0 FCV
KuPS II       bye

Final Table:

Promotion Playoff Group D
Round 1
Dreeverit     5-0 Jaro II
Sepsi-78      bye

Round 2
Jaro II       1-2 Sepsi-78
Dreeverit     bye

Round 3
Sepsi-78      0-1 Dreeverit
Jaro II       bye

Final Table:

Division Two/Division Three Playoffs

First Legs
PS-44         3-2 TKT
Jaro II       2-2 Tervarit
Futura        1-5 KäPa
Ponnistus     2-0 Pantterit
FCV           1-3  KajHa

Second Legs
TKT           4-1 PS-44
Pantterit     3-1 Ponnistus
Tervarit      5-2 Jaro II
KäPa          3-1 Futura
KajHa         6-1 FCV

Ponnistus promoted, Pantterit relegated.
TKT, Tervarit, KäPa and KajHa remain at third level.

Footnotes

References and sources
Finnish FA
ResultCode

Kolmonen seasons
4
Finland
Finland